This is a list of the Locomotives of the Bulgarian State Railways (BDŽ).

Steam locomotives

Express locomotives

Mixed traffic locomotives

Goods locomotives

Tank locomotives

760 mm gauge locomotives

600 mm gauge locomotives

Diesel locomotives

760 mm gauge locomotives 

Surviving locomotives are only used on the Septemvri-Dobrinishte narrow gauge line, Bulgaria's only remaining narrow gauge railway.

Electric locomotives

References 
 
 
 

Bulgaria
!